Sambalpur Road railway station is a railway station on the East Coast Railway network in the state of Odisha, India. It serves Sambalpur city. Its code is SBPD. It has three platforms. Passenger, Express and Superfast trains halt at Sambalpur Road railway station.

Major trains

 Puri–Durg Express
 Puri–Ahmedabad Weekly Express
 Dhanbad–Alappuzha Express
 Puri Jodhpur Express
 Tapaswini Express
 Lokmanya Tilak Terminus–Puri Superfast Express (via Titlagarh)
 Sambalpur–Puri Intercity Express
 Ispat Express
 Samaleshwari Express
 Hirakud Express
 Bhubaneswar–Bolangir Intercity Superfast Express

See also
 Sambalpur district

References

Railway stations in Sambalpur district
Sambalpur railway division